Svein Engen (born 27 March 1953, in Hønefoss) is a former Norwegian biathlete. He competed at the 1976 Winter Olympics in Innsbruck and at the 1980 Winter Olympics in Lake Placid.

He won five Norwegian biathlon championships.

References

1953 births
Living people
People from Ringerike (municipality)
Norwegian male biathletes
Olympic biathletes of Norway
Biathletes at the 1976 Winter Olympics
Biathletes at the 1980 Winter Olympics
Sportspeople from Viken (county)